Priscila Daroit (born ) is a Brazilian female volleyball player.

With her club SESI-SP she competed at the 2014 FIVB Volleyball Women's Club World Championship.

Career
She participated at the 2018 FIVB Volleyball Women's Nations League.

Clubs
  São Caetano (2005–2007)
  Minas Tênis Clube (2007–2010)
  Mackenzie EC (2010–2012)
  Vôlei Amil/Campinas (2012–2013)
  SESI São Paulo (2013–2015)
  Praia Clube (2015–2016)
  Minas Tênis Clube (2016–2018)
  Fluminense FC (2018–2019)
  Praia Clube (2019–2020)
  Minas Tênis Clube (2020–)

Awards
 2014 FIVB Club World Championship –  Bronze medal, with SESI São Paulo
 2013–14 Brazilian Superliga –  Runner-up, with SESI São Paulo
 2015–16 Brazilian Superliga –  Runner-up, with Praia Clube
2020–21 Brazilian Superliga –  Champion, with Itambé/Minas
 2014 South American Club Championship –  Champion, with SESI São Paulo
 2018 South American Club Championship –  Champion, with Minas Tênis Clube
 2020 South American Club Championship –  Runner-Up, with Dentil/Praia Clube

References

External links
 FIVB Profile at FIVB.org

1988 births
Living people
Brazilian women's volleyball players
Place of birth missing (living people)
Wing spikers
Sportspeople from Porto Alegre